Cai Liusheng (18 September 1902 – 24 October 1983) was a Chinese physical chemist and an academician of the Chinese Academy of Sciences. He was one of the founders of catalytic kinetics in China. He was a delegateto the 3rd and 5th National People's Congress.

Biography
Cai was born into a peasant family in Quanzhou, Fujian, on 18 September 1902. He secondary studied at Peiyuan High School. He was fascinated by chemistry since childhood. In 1924, he graduated from Yenching University, where he majored in the Department of Chemistry. He arrived in the United States in 1929 to begin his education at the University of Chicago. He returned to China after graduation and worked at his alma mater Yenching University. In the spring of 1948, he was invited to the University of Washington as a visiting scholar. In 1949, he gave up the opportunity to be employed as a professor at the Graduate School of St. Louis Medical University and returned China to become director of the Department of Chemistry, Yanjing University.

He joined the Communist Party on 4 May 1982.

On 24 October 1983, he died of illness in Changchun, Jilin, aged 81.

Honours and awards
 1957 Member of the Chinese Academy of Sciences (CAS)

References

External links
Biography of Cai Liusheng on the official website of the Chinese Academy of Sciences 

1902 births
1983 deaths
People from Quanzhou
Chemists from Fujian
Yenching University alumni
University of Chicago alumni
Academic staff of Yenching University
Academic staff of Jilin University
Members of the Chinese Academy of Sciences
Delegates to the 3rd National People's Congress
Delegates to the 5th National People's Congress